Maggie Kiley is an American filmmaker and actress.

Career 
Kiley most recently directed her second feature, Dial a Prayer, from a script she wrote.  The film stars Brittany Snow, William H Macy and Glenne Headly and was acquired by Vertical Entertainment for a Spring 2015 release. She is currently in post on a third feature, thriller titled Caught with independent producer Jennifer Westin and Mar Vista Entertainment. Caught stars Anna Camp as a desperate housewife who abducts the mistress (Stefanie Scott) of her cheating husband and all goes south.  Kiley's first feature, Brightest Star premiered at the Austin Film Festival and was released via Warner Brothers and Gravitas in early 2014.  Brightest Star was made through the support of the Panavision New Filmmaker Grant and was inspired by the award-winning short film Some Boys Don't Leave. Cast includes Chris Lowell, Rose McIver, Allison Janney, Clark Gregg and Jessica Szohr.

Kiley was one of eight women selected to take part in American Film Institute's prestigious Directing Workshop for Women and it was through her participation in this program that she made Some Boys Don't Leave.  The film stars Jesse Eisenberg and Eloise Mumford. Kiley received the Student Visionary Award at the Tribeca Film Festival and the Alexis Award for Best Emerging Student Filmmaker at Palm Springs International Shortfest for the film.  In November 2014 it was announced that Kiley was included as one of the 20 accomplished female filmmakers chosen to participate in the Fox Global Directors Initiative, a new multi-year program by the studio to develop the talents and networking pools of promising women directors.

As an actress, Kiley has appeared in film, television and on stage.  She has worked extensively at Atlantic Theater Company in New York City where she is one of just 40 ensemble members.  Kiley received her BFA in Theater from New York University and was invited to join the critically acclaimed ensemble after graduating.  Kiley has worked with such film and television directors as James Gray, Lesli Linka Glatter, Andrew Jarecki, Daisy von Scherler Mayer and Documentarian Nathaniel Kahn.

Kiley is currently developing a series for television with Laverne McKinnon for Denver and Delilah Productions. In 2017, Lucasfilm hired Maggie Kiley as a "resource" for Solo: A Star Wars Story.

References

External links 
 
 

American filmmakers
Living people
Place of birth missing (living people)
Year of birth missing (living people)
American actresses
21st-century American women